In 1816, the London bookbinder John Whittaker (also described as a bookseller or associated with other book-related occupations) produced a luxury edition of Magna Carta on its 600th anniversary. It was officially styled Magna Carta Regis Johannis XV. Die Junii Anno Regni XVII. 

The text of Whittaker's Magna Carta was in gold. Copies in the small edition were intended for the king and other nobles; George III and either John Lambton, 1st Earl of Durham, or his son, were known to have copies. Different copies use different materials: some are printed on vellum, others on satin or paper. About 40 were auctioned in the 20th century. Thomas Frognall Dibdin described Whittaker's Magna Carta as "gorgeous and truly unrivalled" in Bibliographical Decameron.

Citations

Works cited 

 
 
 

1816 books
Magna Carta